Marcus Piavonius Victorinus was emperor in the Gallic provinces from 268 to 270 or 269 to 271, following the brief reign of Marius. He was murdered by a jealous husband whose wife he had tried to seduce.

Reign

Hailing from Gaul, Victorinus was born to a family of great wealth, and was a soldier under Postumus, the first of the so-called Gallic emperors.  He showed considerable ability, as he held the title of tribunus praetorianorum (tribune of the praetorians) in 266/267, and rose swiftly to become co-consul with Postumus in 268. It is also possible that Postumus then elevated him to the post of praetorian prefect. Shortly after putting down a rebellion by Laelianus in 269, Postumus was murdered by his own troops, who appointed Marius as emperor in his place.

After engineering the death of Marius, Victorinus was declared emperor by the troops located at Augusta Treverorum (Trier) in the fall of 269. His principal concern was to prevent the western provinces from submitting to the central authority of the Roman Empire, a fact made clear to him from the first few weeks when only the provinces of Gaul, Germania and Britain recognised him. Hispania deserted the Gallic Empire and declared its loyalty to Claudius Gothicus. Claudius then sent his trusted general Placidianus to south-east Gaul with instructions to bring over as many of the wavering cities as he could. Very quickly Placidianus captured Cularo (Grenoble), but did not proceed any further.

The presence of Placidianus inspired the city of Augustodunum Haeduorum (Autun) to abandon Victorinus and declare its intention to declare for Claudius Gothicus.  This forced Victorinus to march south and besiege it, where it fell after seven months, after which Victorinus’ troops plundered and destroyed the city. Victorinus returned to Colonia Claudia Ara Agrippinensium (Cologne) in triumph. It remains a mystery just why Claudius did not authorise Placidianus to go to the relief of Augustodunum; however, it is speculated that Claudius, who was fully engaged either in Italy against the Alamanni or in the Balkans against the Goths, did not wish to open a second theatre of operations in Gaul, which would not only have involved a major military effort, but would also have required Claudius to assume responsibility for the defense of the Rhine frontier had he been successful. There is evidence to suggest that Claudius was having some difficulties in the East, which also occupied his attention.

Victorinus was murdered at Colonia in early 271 by Attitianus, one of his officers, whose wife Victorinus had supposedly seduced.  Since the motive was personal and not political, Victorinus' mother, Victoria (or Vitruvia), was able to continue to hold power after the death of Victorinus and she arranged for his deification and, after considerable payment to the troops, the appointment of Tetricus I as his successor. Another military commander appears to have been proclaimed as the emperor Domitianus II, but was soon eliminated.

Victorinus is listed among the Thirty Tyrants in the Historia Augusta. The dubious Historia Augusta equally has a short description of Victorinus Junior, allegedly the son of Victorinus, who was appointed emperor by his family the day his father was murdered, and would have been killed immediately afterwards by the troops. The Historia Augusta also says that both father and son were buried near Colonia Claudia Ara Agrippinensium in marble tombs.

Notes

References

Sources

Primary sources
 Aurelius Victor, Epitome de Caesaribus
 Aurelius Victor, Liber de Caesaribus
 Eutropius, Brevarium, Book 9
 Historia Augusta, The Thirty Tyrants

Secondary sources
 
 
 
 
 J. F. Drinkwater, The Gallic Empire: Separatism and Continuity in the North-western Provinces of the Roman Empire A.D. 260–274 (Stuttgart 1987)
 Richard Abdy, "The Domitian II coin from Chalgrove: a Gallic emperor returns to history". Antiquity. 83 (321), 2009: 751–757.

External links

 

Gallic emperors
Deified Roman emperors
Thirty Tyrants (Roman)
Imperial Roman consuls
3rd-century monarchs in Europe
3rd-century murdered monarchs
Piavonii
Murdered Roman emperors
Year of birth unknown
270s deaths
Year of death uncertain
Gallic consuls